Chris Schmidt may refer to:

Chris Schmidt (footballer) (born 1989), Australian footballer
Chris Schmidt (ice hockey) (born 1976), Canadian ice hockey centre who plays in Germany